Lin Teng-chiao is a Taiwanese politician who has been the Administrative  Deputy Minister of Education since 20 May 2016.

Early life
Lin obtained his bachelor's degree in computer science and information engineering from Tamkang University, master's degree in industrial relations and China studies from National Taiwan Normal University (NTNU) and Tamkang University respectively and doctoral degree in industrial education from NTNU.

References

Living people
Political office-holders in the Republic of China on Taiwan
Year of birth missing (living people)
Tamkang University alumni
National Taiwan Normal University alumni